"Lackey" is a song by English indie rock band The Others and is featured on their debut album, The Others. Released on 17 January 2005, it was the third single from the album and charted at number 21 on the UK Singles Chart.

Track listing
 "Lackey"  
 "King Prawn"

2004 singles
The Others (band) songs
2004 songs
Mercury Records singles